Demetrius Ferreira Leite (born 19 January 1974) is a Brazilian former professional footballer who played as a right-back.

Career
Efficient from his beginnings, the Brazilian knew his technical qualities shown notably in offensive stages. While he was traced by number of English clubs, the ex-Bastia defender chose to sign with Olympique de Marseille for two years in June 2004, having been on loan there since January 2004. His first complete season (2004–05) was mediocre, just like the team. Whilst at Marseille he started in the 2004 UEFA Cup Final.

In 2005–06, he played good matches before losing his place because of much more mediocre performances. He was later used merely to fill in at the end of match for injured or suspended players. His contract ended in June 2006. During the 2006–07 season, he played for Troyes AC in France.

References

External links
Profile at LFP.fr

Living people
1974 births
Brazilian footballers
Association football fullbacks
Ligue 1 players
Qatar Stars League players
Guarani FC players
AS Nancy Lorraine players
SC Bastia players
Olympique de Marseille players
ES Troyes AC players
S.S.C. Napoli players
Al-Rayyan SC players
Brazilian expatriate footballers
Brazilian expatriate sportspeople in France
Expatriate footballers in France
Footballers from São Paulo